Klique was an American R&B trio, consisting of Howard Huntsberry, Isaac Suthers and his sister, Deborah Hunter. They released four albums, starting with It's Winning Time in 1981, concluding with Love Cycles in 1985.  Their only song to make the US Billboard Hot 100 chart was a cover version of Jackie Wilson's 1960 hit, "Stop Doggin' Me Around," which reached #50 on the Hot 100 and #2 on the US Billboard R&B chart in 1983. In total, they had nine songs on Billboards R&B chart.

Discography

Studio albums

Singles

References

External links
 Discography at Discogs.

American funk musical groups
American soul musical groups